Pete Brown (born 1968) is an English writer who has written extensively on the subject of beer and drinking cultures around the world. He has written twelve books; Man Walks Into a Pub, Three Sheets to the Wind, Hops and Glory, Shakespeare's Local, World's Best Cider, The Pub, Miracle Brew, The Apple Orchard, Pie Fidelity, Craft: An Argument, Beer By Design: The Art of Good Beer Branding, and Clubland: How the Working Men's Club Shaped Britain . Brown, who was born in Barnsley, South Yorkshire, lives in London.

Career
Brown attended the University of St Andrews. He spent the early part of his career in advertising, including writing strategy for Stella Artois and Heineken, before writing his debut book Man Walks Into a Pub in 2003, a history of drink and drinking. His second effort, Three Sheets to the Wind, was published in 2006 and explores the differences and similarities in drinking cultures around the world. Brown travelled 45,000 miles and visited 13 countries researching the book. In Brown's third book, Hops and Glory, he retraces the historical journey of India Pale Ale, from Burton-on-Trent in England to Kolkata, India, taking a specially brewed barrel of the beer along with him. The book's working title was Pale and Interesting.

Brown has also appeared on television as an authority on beer, as well giving talks and lectures on the subject, including at the 2009 Latitude Festival.
Brown was named the British Guild of Beer Writers' Beer Writer of the Year in 2009, 2012, 2016 and 2021. He was Chair of the British Guild of Beer Writers from 2017 to 2020.

Bibliography
Man Walks Into a Pub: A Sociable History of Beer  (2004)
Three Sheets to the Wind: One Man's Quest for the Meaning of Beer (2007)
Hops and Glory: One Man's Search for the Beer that Built the British Empire (2009)
Shakespeare's Local: Six Centuries of History Seen Through One Extraordinary Pub - Radio 4 Book of the Week
World's Best Cider: Taste, Tradition and Terroir, from Somerset to Seattle (2013) (with Bill Bradshaw) - Winner of the Fortnum & Mason Drink Book Award
The Pub: A Cultural Institution from Country Inns to Craft Beer Bars and Corner Locals (2016) - Winner of the Fortnum & Mason Drink Book Award  
The Apple Orchard: The Story of Our Most English Fruit (2016) - Radio 4 Book of the Week, shortlisted for the 2016 André Simon Food & Drink Book Award
Miracle Brew: Adventures in the Nature of Beer (2017) - Shortlisted for the 2017 André Simon Food and Drink Book Award
Pie Fidelity: In Defence of British Food (2019)
Craft: An Argument (2020)
Beer By Design: The Art of Good Beer Branding (2020)
Clubland: How the Working Men's Club Shaped Britain (2022)

References

External links
 Interview with Pete Brown following the release of Three Sheets to the Wind
 Interview with Pete Brown following the release of Hops and Glory

1968 births
Living people
People from Barnsley
Alumni of the University of St Andrews
Beer culture
English food writers